Minić is a surname. It may refer to:

 Dragoljub Minić, Yugoslav chess Grandmaster
 Miloš Minić, Serbian Communist politician
 Serafin Rafael Minić, Croatian-Italian mathematician

Serbian surnames
Croatian surnames